Darcy Irwin Rota (born February 16, 1953) is a Canadian former professional ice hockey player who spent eleven seasons in the National Hockey League. He featured in the 1982 Stanley Cup Finals with the Vancouver Canucks.

Playing career
Born  in Vancouver, British Columbia, Darcy's  formative years including Bantam / Midget level hockey were in Prince George, British Columbia. Rota played his junior hockey with the Edmonton Oil Kings of the WCHL, helping the club reach the Memorial Cup in 1971 and 1972. A dangerous sniper, he led the WCHL in goals in 1972–73, notching 73 in just 68 games en route to a 129-point season. Following the season, he was selected 13th overall by the Chicago Black Hawks in the 1973 NHL Amateur Draft.

Rota stepped straight into the Black Hawks' roster in 1973–74, and turned in a solid rookie season with 21 goals and 33 points in 74 games. Over the next several seasons, Rota developed into a solid, gritty, two-way player who made a solid contribution at both ends of the ice, although he didn't develop into the type of scorer it was thought he could be when he was drafted. He scored at least 20 goals in each of his first four seasons in Chicago, with his best year as a Black Hawk coming in 1976–77 when he co-lead the team with 24 goals.

Late in the 1978–79 season, Rota was dealt along with Ivan Boldirev to the Atlanta Flames in a blockbuster trade which saw Tom Lysiak moving to Chicago. He started off well in Atlanta with 9 goals in 13 games to close the season, but struggled in 1979–80 with just 18 points through 44 games. Midway through the season, he and Boldirev were dealt again, this time to the Vancouver Canucks, giving a delighted Rota a chance to play for his hometown team.

Rota's first full season as a Canuck in 1980–81 would be the best in his career to that point, as he notched career highs with 25 goals and 56 points. He would miss a substantial chunk of the 1981–82 campaign with a knee injury, but was a key component of the squad which reached the 1982 Stanley Cup finals, notching 6 goals in 17 playoff games.

For the 1982–83 season, Rota spent much of the year on a dynamic line with Thomas Gradin and Stan Smyl, and turned in the finest year of his career. He led the team in goals with 42 and finished with 81 points, both of which set club records (since broken by Markus Näslund) for a left winger.

Rota continued to excel in 1983–84, and was selected to play in his first NHL All-Star Game. He appeared to be on target for another season of close to 40 goals when he suffered a serious neck injury on a check from Jay Wells of the Los Angeles Kings. He managed to return for the playoffs, but was eventually forced to undergo spinal fusion surgery in the summer of 1984. He attempted to rejoin the Canucks in November of that year, but was warned that he risked further injury if he continued to play. After a few practices, he opted to retire.

Rota finished his career with 256 goals and 239 assists for 495 points in 794 NHL games, along with 973 penalty minutes. Rota Fans called themselves the "Rota Rooters"!

Management career
Rota was hired to work in public relations for the Canucks, and served in various positions in the team's front office, including a spell as Director of Player Development, until they parted ways in 1990. He then spent a stretch working for the NHL as an assistant to league president John Ziegler. From 1994 to 1996 he served as a commentator on Canucks TV telecasts alongside Jim Robson.

In 1998, Rota became head coach of the expansion Burnaby Bulldogs of the BCHL. Rota resides in the city of Coquitlam, and in 2000 he became part-owner, president, and general manager of the expansion Coquitlam Express of the BCHL. He built the team which won the 2006 Royal Bank Cup. Rota left the organization after the 2014 season.

Career statistics

Awards
 WCHL Second All-Star Team – 1972
 WCHL All-Star Team – 1973

References

External links
 
Profile at hockeydraftcentral.com

1953 births
Living people
Atlanta Flames players
Canadian ice hockey left wingers
Chicago Blackhawks draft picks
Chicago Blackhawks players
Edmonton Oil Kings (WCHL) players
Houston Aeros draft picks
Sportspeople from Prince George, British Columbia
Ice hockey people from Vancouver
National Hockey League All-Stars
National Hockey League broadcasters
National Hockey League first-round draft picks
Vancouver Canucks announcers
Vancouver Canucks executives
Vancouver Canucks players
World Hockey Association first round draft picks